Sugarbaby  is the third extended play album from American rock ensemble Morningwood.  The song "Sugarbaby" is featured in episode "Drama Follows Them" for television show The Hills, in addition to being the theme song for television program You're Cut Off!.

Critical reception 
Snobsmusic.net describes the song "Sugarbaby" as being "reminiscent of late-era, overly slick Garbage".  Devin Estlin of Bust.com describes the EP as "a party just waiting to happen".  Sputnikmusic describes the eponymous single as "a step to the left from their previous release" with "atrocious lyrics".

Track listing 
 Sugarbaby - 3:02
 That's How You Know It's Love - 3:35
 Killer Life - 2:33
 Best Of Me - 3:00

References 

2008 EPs
Morningwood albums